The House of Haro was one of the most powerful families of Castile during the Middle Ages and strongly supported the expansionist policies of Alfonso VI of Castile. As a reward, Íñigo López was named the first Lord of Biscay.

In the early 16th century, the Haro family married paternally into the House of Sotomayor establishing a branch that would go on to hold dominion over the Marquesado del Carpio established in 1559 by King Philip II of Spain.

Bibliography 
 Salazar y Castro, Luis, Historia genealógica de la Casa de Haro, Dalmiro de la Válgoma y Díaz-Varela, Madrid, 1959.
 Baury, Ghislain, "Diego López 'le bon' et Diego López 'le mauvais' : comment s'est construite la mémoire d'un magnat du règne d'Alphonse VIII de Castille", Berceo, n°144, 2003, p. 37-92. 
 Baury, Ghislain, « Los ricoshombres y el rey en Castilla : El linaje Haro, 1076-1322 », Territorio, Sociedad y Poder : Revista de Estudios Medievales, 6, 2011, p. 53-72. .
 Baury, Ghislain, « La grande aristocratie et le système judiciaire dans le royaume de Castille (XIIe-XIIIe s.). Les sentences des ricoshombres du lignage Haro », Bruno Lemesle et Benoît Garnot (dir.), Autour de la sentence judiciaire du Moyen Âge à l'époque contemporaine, Dijon, EUD, 2012, p. 239-248.
 Baury, Ghislain, Les religieuses de Castille. Patronage aristocratique et ordre cistercien, XIIe-XIIIe siècles, Rennes, Presses Universitaires de Rennes, 2012, .

See also
Basque señoríos

 
Spanish families